County Clare is a county in the Republic of Ireland.

County Clare may also refer to:

 Clare (Parliament of Ireland constituency), a constituency until 1800
 Clare (UK Parliament constituency), a constituency from 1801 to 1885
 Clare County Council, the authority responsible for local government in County Clare, Ireland
 Clare County, Michigan, a county in the United States

See also
 The Boys from County Clare, a 2003 film